Pomona Unified School District or PUSD serves approximately 30,000 Pre-K-12 students and 17,000 adult learners at 44 schools in Pomona and Diamond Bar, California. It is located 30 miles east of downtown Los Angeles, and is the third-largest school district in Los Angeles County.

In 1995 the school district bought the former Indian Hill Mall, a failing shopping center built in the 1960s, and redeveloped it into an educational, commercial and retail complex called The Village at Indian Hill.

In November 2008, 75% of voters approved Measure PS, a $235 million school bond measure, to provide for the renovation of schools.  The first of the Measure PS projects were completed in summer 2009.  Another round of projects was set for summer 2010, at 21 schools.

Board of Education
Adrienne Konigar-Macklin, President
Andrew S. Wong, Vice-President
Dr. Roberta A. Perlman, Member
Lorena Gonzalez, Member
Arturo Jimenez, Member
Board of Education members are elected to a four-year term. The elections are held on a first Tuesday after the first Monday in November of even-numbered years effective with the 2018 election.

Administration
Superintendent: Richard Martinez
Deputy Superintendent, Human Resources: Darren Knowles
Interim Assistant Superintendent, Educational Services: Lilia Fuentes
Interim Assistant Superintendent, Chief Financial Officer: Sandra Garcia
Assistant Superintendent, Pupil & Community Services: Fernando Meza
Public Information Officer: Oliver Unaka

Pomona Unified Schools

All sections in the city are zoned to an elementary, middle, and high school.

Elementary Schools

Middle Schools
Emerson Middle School
Fremont Academy of Engineering and Design 
Lorbeer Middle School - California Distinguished School, 1999; National Blue Ribbon School, 1999–2000
Marshall Middle School
Palomares Academy of Health Sciences
Simons Middle School
High Schools
Diamond Ranch High School - California Distinguished School, 2003, 2007.  One of America's 600 Best High Schools, U.S. News & World Report, 2007, 2008
Ganesha High School a Gold Ribbon School 2015 and Title 1 Academic Achievement School 2015
Garey High School
Park West High School
Pomona High School - California Distinguished School, 1992
Village Academy High School - One of America's 600 Best High Schools, U.S. News & World Report, 2007, 2008; California Distinguished School, 2009; Title I Academic Achievement Award, 2006–07, 2007–08, 2008–09
 Other Schools
School of Extended Educational Options (SEEO) - District-dependent charter school serving grades 7-12
Pomona Alternative School
Pomona Adult and Career Education
Child Development Program
Head Start
State Preschool
Los Angeles Universal Preschool (LAUP)
Early Head Start
Cal-SAFE
Resource and Referral
Alternative Payment
CalWORKS

References

External links
  Pomona Unified School District website
  Proud2be Redirect URL

Education in Pomona, California
School districts in Los Angeles County, California